Centrolene hesperia is a species of frog in the family Centrolenidae.
It is endemic to Peru.
Its natural habitats are subtropical or tropical moist montane forests and rivers.
It is threatened by habitat loss.

References

hesperia
Amphibians of Peru
Taxonomy articles created by Polbot
Amphibians described in 1990
Taxobox binomials not recognized by IUCN